Neuromuscular diagnostic tests are medical tests performed to diagnose disorders of the muscles and nerves. The most common neuromuscular diagnostic tests include:

 Electromyography
 Evoked potential
 Muscle biopsy
 Nerve biopsy

Neurology
Electrodiagnosis